Frank Crocker was a British publican, owner of the Crown Hotel in St John's Wood, London, renamed Crocker's Folly in 1987 in his honour.

Crocker's Folly
Crocker's Folly is a Grade II* listed public house at 23-24 Aberdeen Place, St John's Wood, London. It was built in 1898, in a Northern Renaissance style, and was previously called The Crown. Brandwood and Jephcote describe it as "a truly magnificent pub-cum-hotel" with "superb fittings", including extensive use of marble. The architect was Charles Worley.

In 1987, the pub's name was changed to Crocker's Folly. The story was that Frank Crocker built the pub to serve the new terminus of the Great Central Railway, but when the terminus was actually built it was over half a mile away at Marylebone Station, leading to Crocker's ruin, despair and eventual suicide. In reality, Crocker did die in 1904, aged only 41, but of natural causes. It has been claimed that Crocker's ghost haunts the pub.

The building is now an upmarket bar and Lebanese restaurant, with accommodation on the upper floors.

Personal life
Prior to building the Crown Hotel, Crocker already owned The Volunteer pub in Kilburn, London.

References

1863 births
1904 deaths
People from Newton Abbot
British publicans
19th-century British businesspeople